Septimus "Sep" Heyns Ledger (29 April 1889 – 13 April 1917) was a South African rugby union player from Kimberley, South Africa. He was killed in World War I, in Arras, France while serving as a sergeant in the South African Infantry. He was a clerk by profession.

Ledger took part in the 1912–13 South Africa rugby union tour. He was awarded four caps, the first against  where he scored a try. His club team was Griqualand West.

See also
 List of international rugby union players killed in action during the First World War

References

External links
 Commonwealth War Graves database

1889 births
1917 deaths
Rugby union forwards
Rugby union players from Kimberley, Northern Cape
South Africa international rugby union players
South African military personnel killed in World War I
South African military personnel of World War I
South African people of British descent
South African rugby union players
White South African people
Griquas (rugby union) players